{{Infobox school 
| name        = Sabuj Palli High School 
| logo        = Logo_Of_Sabuj_palli_High_school.png
| logo_size   = 150px
| logo_alt    = 
| caption     = Logo Of Sabuj Palli High School
| motto       = Discipline, study, practice''’
| established = 
| language    = Bengali
| campus      = Rural
| affiliation = WBBSE and WBCHSE
| type        = Govt. sponsored school
| gender      = Co-educational 
| students    = 1200
| address     = Barasakdal, Dinhata II, Cooch Behar , West Bengal
| postalcode  = 736169
| location    = Cooch Behar
| state       = West Bengal
| country     = India   
| coordinates = 
| pushpin_map = India West Bengal#India

| website      = 
| footnotes    =
}}Sabujpalli High School''' is a co-educational school. It was established in 02 January 1971 and it is managed by the Department of Education. It is located in the Dinhata II block of Cooch Bihar district of West Bengal, India.

Gallery

See also

 WBBSE
 WBCHSE
 School Education WB
 Kanyashree

References

External links 
 https://school.banglarshiksha.gov.in/
 https://wbbse.wb.gov.in/
 https://wbchse.wb.gov.in/

Schools in Cooch Behar district
High schools and secondary schools in West Bengal